Spaniards were a short-lived Australian musical group, which formed in 1983. Their 1986 debut mini-album, Locked in a Dance peaked at number 55 on the Australian charts. It was produced by Mark Opitz. Members included Russell Hellyer-Brown on bass guitar, Mark Mannock on keyboards, Billy Miller on guitars and vocals (ex-The Ferrets), and Mick Pealing on vocals (ex-Stars, Ideals).

Discography

Studio albums

Singles

Second Lineup 1986 - 1989
Mick Pealing Vocals,  
Russell Brown Bass Vocals,
Chris Ziros Guitar Vocals,
Antony Ziros Drums, 
Mark Mannock Keyboards,

References

Musical groups established in 1983
Musical groups disestablished in 1986